KFEG (104.7 FM, "104.7 The Eagle") is a radio station broadcasting a classic rock music format. It is licensed to Klamath Falls, Oregon, United States. The station is currently owned by Wynne Broadcasting, LLC, and licensed to Cove Road Publishing, LLC.

History
The Federal Communications Commission issued a construction permit for the station to Klamath Basin Broadcasting on April 20, 2000. The station was issued the KFEG call sign on May 12, 2000. On January 2, 2001, the station's permit was transferred by Klamath Basin to the current owners, Cove Road Publishing. The station received its license to cover on June 17, 2002.

References

External links

FEG
Klamath Falls, Oregon
Radio stations established in 2002
Classic rock radio stations in the United States
2002 establishments in Oregon